is a city located in Gifu, Japan. , the city had an estimated population of 20,749 in 8149 households, and a population density of 180 persons per km2. The city is renowned for traditional Japanese Mino washi paper and its streets, which are in the style of the early Edo period (1603–1868). An urban area known as "Udatsu Townscape" (うだつのあがるまちなみ) is designated as an important traditional building group conservation area by the government on May 13, 1999.

Geography
Mino is located in the south-central Gifu Prefecture. The Nagara River and the Itadori River flow through the city. Mino is surrounded by the city of Seki to the west, south and east, and by the city of Gujō to the north.

Climate
The city has a climate characterized by hot and humid summers, and mild winters (Köppen climate classification Cfa).

Neighbouring municipalities
 Gifu Prefecture
 Seki
 Gujō

Demographics
Per Japanese census data, the population of Mino has decreased gradually over the past 40 years.

History
The area around Mino was part of traditional Mino Province. During the Edo period, Kanamori Nagachika, the founder of Takayama Domain was granted permission by Tokugawa Ieyasu to build Oguriyama Castle on the Nagara River. Due to floods, the castle town was relocated in 1605 to higher ground. The area later became part of the holdings of Owari Domain under the Tokugawa shogunate. In the post-Meiji restoration cadastral reforms, Mugi District in Gifu Prefecture was created, and with the establishment of the modern municipalities system on July 1, 1889 the town of Kozuchi was created. In July 1909 Kozuchi was the site of a meteorite impact.
On April 1, 1911, Kozuchi was renamed Mino . Mino was raised to city status on April 1, 1954 with the merger of the town of Mino with the villages of Suhara, Shimomaki, Kamimaki, Oyada, Aimi, and Nakauchi.

Government
Mino has a mayor-council form of government with a directly elected mayor and a unicameral city legislature of 13 members.

Education
Mino has five public elementary schools and two public middle schools operated by the city government. The city has one public high school operated by the Gifu Prefectural Board of Education.

Transportation

Railway
  - Nagaragawa Railway Etsumi-Nan Line
  -  -  -   -

Highway
 Tōkai-Hokuriku Expressway
 Tōkai-Kanjō Expressway

Sister city relations
  - Meinong District, Kaohsiung, Taiwan, friendship city since November 29, 2012

Local attractions
 Ogurayama Castle Ruins
 Yawata Shrine

Notable people from Mino
 Chiune Sugihara, diplomat

References

External links
 
 Mino City official website 

 
Cities in Gifu Prefecture